Manistee Lake is an unincorporated community and census-designated place (CDP) in Kalkaska County in the U.S. state of Michigan.  At the 2010 census, the CDP had a population of 456.  Manistee Lake is located within Coldsprings Township to the north and a small portion extending south into Excelsior Township.

History
The community of Manistee Lake was listed as a newly-organized census-designated place for the 2010 census, meaning it now has officially defined boundaries and population statistics for the first time.  The CDP is organized for statistical purposes only and has no legal status as an incorporated municipality.

Geography

The community surrounds Manistee Lake.  The majority of the community and population is located within Coldsprings Township, which contains  of total area.  A smaller portion extends to the south in Excelsior Township.

Demographics

References

Unincorporated communities in Kalkaska County, Michigan
Unincorporated communities in Michigan
Census-designated places in Kalkaska County, Michigan
Census-designated places in Michigan
Traverse City micropolitan area